Manon des Sources may refer to:

 Manon des Sources (1952 film), a French film directed by Marcel Pagnol, or the novel he published in 1962
 Manon des Sources (1986 film), a French film directed by Claude Berri